Xanthosia is a genus of plants of family Apiaceae, but sometimes also placed in Araliaceae or Mackinlayaceae. It comprises 20 species of shrubs endemic to Australia. The habit may also be as a herb. They are found in all Australian states, but not found in the Northern Territory.
 
   	
Species include:
Xanthosia atkinsoniana F.Muell.
Xanthosia bungei Keighery
Xanthosia candida (Benth.) Steud.
Xanthosia ciliata Hook.
Xanthosia collina Keighery
Xanthosia dissecta — Cut-leaf xanthosia
Xanthosia eichleri J.M.Hart & Henwood
Xanthosia fruticulosa Benth.
Xanthosia huegelii (Benth.) Steud. — Heath xanthosia
Xanthosia leiophylla — Parsley xanthosia
Xanthosia peduncularis Benth.
Xanthosia pilosa
Xanthosia pusilla — Heath xanthosia
Xanthosia rotundifolia DC. — Southern cross
Xanthosia singuliflora F.Muell.
Xanthosia sp. Dardanup (B.J. Keighery & N. Gibson 174)
Xanthosia stellata — Star xanthosia
Xanthosia tasmanica Domin — Southern xanthosia
Xanthosia tomentosa A.S.George
Xanthosia tridentata — Hill xanthosia

References

Mackinlayoideae
Apiaceae genera
Apiales of Australia
Plants described in 1811
Taxa named by Edward Rudge